The Riggs-Hamilton American Legion Post No. 20 is a historic social meeting hall at 215 North Denver Avenue in Russellville, Arkansas.  It is a -story stone structure, with a gable roof and stone foundation. Its eaves and gable ends show exposed rafter ends in the Craftsman style, and the main facade has a half-timbered stucco section above twin entrances, each with their own gabled roofs.  It was built in 1934, and is one of the finest examples of WPA Rustic architecture in Pope County.

The building was listed on the National Register of Historic Places in 1994, for its architecture.

Legion meetings are held 6:00 pm second Tuesday of each month.  The building also is the meeting place for the Pope County Republican party members, 6:00 pm third Tuesday each month. On the first Wednesday of each month is Hooner's Bingo Night, in which fabulous prizes are won.

See also
National Register of Historic Places listings in Pope County, Arkansas

References

American Legion buildings
Cultural infrastructure completed in 1936
Buildings and structures in Russellville, Arkansas
WPA Rustic architecture
Clubhouses on the National Register of Historic Places in Arkansas
National Register of Historic Places in Pope County, Arkansas
Individually listed contributing properties to historic districts on the National Register in Arkansas
1936 establishments in Arkansas
Works Progress Administration in Arkansas